Love Crimes is a 1992 American thriller film directed by Lizzie Borden starring Sean Young and Patrick Bergin about an assistant district attorney who tries to seduce and apprehend a psychopath. The screenplay is by Allan Moyle and Laurie Frank, based on a story by Moyle.

Plot
Assistant district attorney Dana Greenway conspires with police lieutenant Maria Johnson to go after a serial sexual predator who identifies himself to his victims as "David Hanover," a distinguished photographer.

Greenway goes undercover, changing her appearance and passing herself off as a repressed schoolteacher. She eventually encounters Hanover, who seduces her, photographs her nude and causes Lt. Johnson to believe that Greenway might actually have fallen under his spell.

Flashbacks to her troubled childhood, including abuse from a father who locked her in a closet, haunt Greenway as she attempts to come to her senses and get the better of Hanover, who clearly intends to humiliate and then kill her.

Cast
 Sean Young as Dana Greenway
 Patrick Bergin as David Hanover
 James Read as Stanton Gray
 Arnetia Walker as Lt. Maria Johnson
 Fern Dorsey as Colleen

Reception
Love Crimes received negative reviews from critics and flopped at the box office.

Young earned a Razzie Award nomination as Worst Actress for her performance in the film, where she lost to Melanie Griffith for both Shining Through and A Stranger Among Us. The film is listed in Golden Raspberry Award founder John Wilson's book The Official Razzie Movie Guide as one of the 100 Most Enjoyably Bad Movies Ever Made.

Lizzie Borden has said in an online interview with The Important Cinema Club that Harvey Weinstein wanted the ending changed before the film began production, so there was "no script" going in, throwing production into chaos. The film was taken out of her hands during post-production and filmmaker Kit Carson shot flashbacks against Borden's will. Borden wanted to take her name off the film but Weinstein threatened to "destroy her career" if she did. She also said there was never a "director's cut." This was just a marketing ploy by Weinstein to release a version with more erotic footage in the hopes of drawing more box office.

References

External links

1992 films
1990s erotic thriller films
American erotic thriller films
Films directed by Lizzie Borden (director)
Films scored by Graeme Revell
Films set in Georgia (U.S. state)
Films shot in Georgia (U.S. state)
Miramax films
1990s English-language films
1990s American films